Moon Witch, Spider King is a 2022 fantasy novel by Jamaican writer Marlon James. It is the second book of a planned trilogy, after Black Leopard, Red Wolf. The novel tells a story parallel to, and intersecting with, the first novel.  The novel draws on African history and mythology, blended into the landscape of the North Kingdom and the South Kingdom, and the political tensions between these two warring states, as well as various city-states and tribes in the surrounding landscape. The rights to produce a film adaptation were purchased by Michael B. Jordan in February 2019 before the release of the first book.

Plot 
The novel is told in a more straightforward linear style than Black Leopard, Red Wolf.

Part 1 No Name Woman 
The plot follows Sogolon, who starts as a nameless young girl enslaved and abused by her brothers. Sogolon escapes and flees to the city of Kongor in the Northern Kingdom, where she is taken in by Miss Azora, the owner of a "house of pleasurable goods and services." Miss Azora gives Sogolon shelter and eventually forces her into prostitution. Sogolon survives by drugging the men that come to have sex with her and stealing from them, plotting to leave the pleasure house. Sogolon unknowingly steals a talisman from one of the johns linked to an Ukundunka, a monster that protects the owner, and the owner's wife, the willful Mistress Komwono, comes to collect it, killing most of the prostitutes and Miss Azora. Mistress Komwono recognizes the craftiness and grit in Sogolon and extends an offer for Sogolon to be her ward, which Sogolon accepts. Sogolon's time in the Komwono household is spent sleeping in the slave quarters, being ignored by Master Komwono (who recognized her from the pleasure house), and learning proper behavior from Mistress Komwono. Sogolon is forbidden from entering the library of the house and witnesses Master Komwono's mistreatment of the enslaved people and staff, which Mistress Komwono ignores and enables. Eventually, Sogolon's curiosity leads her to enter the library and discover what Master Komwono calls the "boli," a sort of vessel for seemingly mystical power. Master Komwono berates Sogolon and attempts to force himself on her. An unknown force (later named by Sogolon as her wind (no wind), a magical manifestation- prevents this and impales Master Komwono on the ceiling. An investigation follows, and Mistress Komwono leads the household back to the capital city of Fasisi, attempting to rejoin the royal court after an exile.

While in the city, Sogolon meets Keme, a royal guard who shares an attraction with Sogolon; and the Aesi, an advisor to the king. Sogolon encounters the Aesi frequently, who has a growing interest in Sogolon, and meets the abusive princes and the Sangomin, child-like witchfinders devoted to the Aesi who all exhibit special abilities. Mistress Komwono gives Sogolon as a gift to Princess Emini, and Sogolon joins the royal household. Princess Emini treats Sogolon poorly as Sogolon does not appear to have any "women's skills". When threatened, Sogolon's wind (no wind) grows stronger during this time.

Sogolon begins to uncover the inner workings of the royal family: Princess Emini rules the kingdom in all but name, and as the royal daughter, it will be her duty to birth and raise the future King when her father dies while her brother rules until the new King comes of age. However, Emini's husband appears to be barren and rumors spread throughout the city of Emini's sexual encounters with other court members attempting to conceive a bastard to take the throne. The Aesi seems to have mystical powers that allow him to use magic and remove memories from the court members. Sogolon uncovers clues to a mystery surrounding Commander Olu of the royal guard who is losing his memories and a woman named Jeleza. The current King dies, and the new king, Kwash Moki (formerly Prince Likud), puts Emini on trial for whoredom, murdering several of her supposed lovers and exiling her and Sogolon to Mantha, a walled city inhabited by nuns that is all but a life sentence to prison. At the same time, Kwash Moki declares war on Wakadishu, a Southern province. En route to Mantha, Emini reveals her failed plans to try and maintain the kingdom through birthing and raising a bastard on the throne and plans on a scroll for a great city hidden in the trees. Sogolon shares her theory that the Aesi is removing memories from the royal family and court to maintain power behind the throne, wondering how long the Aesi has been in the kingdom. The Sangomin attack the caravan and murder the nuns and escorts and Emini. Sogolon flees and is caught by the Sangomin. Before the Sangomin can kill her, Sogolon summons the wind (no wind) and kills them all, destroying the caravan and leaving a great crater. Shocked and lost, Sogolon wanders the wilderness and is found by the royal guard, including Keme, who does not recognize Sogolon (due to memory tempering from the Aesi). Keme and the royal guard capture Sogolon and return her to Fasisi.

Part 2 A Girl Is A Hunted Animal
The royal guard intends to question Sogolon, but no one questions her due to the war in the South. Keme takes Sogolon back to his home, and she becomes his common-law wife and lives with his first wife, Yétúnde, and their children. Sogolon settles into a double life- by day, she is Keme's common-law wife, and by night, she battles in gladiator fights as No Name Boy, binding her breasts to appear as a young boy. The gladiator fights serve as a release for Sogolon's rage. Sogolon becomes pregnant and gives birth to 4 children, two of whom are lions, shocking Sogolon. Keme reveals that he is a shapeshifter and lion but has hidden this as shapeshifters are treated as second-class citizens in Fasisi. Sogolon encourages Keme to live as himself openly, disgusting Yétúnde. Sogolon discovers that Yétúnde murdered her own children if they showed any signs of being lion or shapeshifter, angering Keme, and Yétúnde flees. Sogolon raises all 7 children as her own while still attending gladiator fights as No Name Boy and avoiding the royal household and the Aesi. Sogolon eventually reencounters Commander Ulu, who by this point has lost all of his memories of his former life and lives as a street urchin due to the Aesi's magic. This encounter alerts the Aesi to Sogolon's presence, and he attacks her home with the royal guard, killing one of her children. Enraged, Sogolon uses the wind (no wind) to murder the Aesi and the guards. With the Aesi gone, the royal household is freed from his magic, plunging the kingdom into chaos. Sogolon grieves her child, taking her grief out on Keme and the other children, and the grief numbs Sogolon.

Part 3 Moon Witch
In a narrative jump forward, Sogolon now lives in the Sunk City a vast jungle, foraging and living among the monkeys and animals of the jungle. Sogolon does not recall her previous life, and she becomes a vengeful hunter of men who abuse women, known far and wide as Witch of the Silver Moon, or Moon Witch, using her wind (no wind), combat skills, and poisons and tricks. Sogolon lives in the Sunk City for over 170 years, and her rage and magic are so strong that "time does not touch her", and she does not age. Eventually, Sogolon is tricked into meeting Popele of the Bunshi, a minor water spirit, and Nsaka Ne Vampi, Sogolon's great-great-granddaughter. They try to convert Sogolon to their cause and reveal her past to her.

In flashback, told as a narrative story to Sogolon, Popele and Nsaka tell Sogolon that she abandoned Keme and her family centuries ago when she heard that the Aesi was alive in the South. When the Aesi dies, he is reborn as an ordinary boy 8 years later, and when he turns 12, he becomes reincarnated as the Aesi once more. Sogolon learned he was about to come of age in Omororo in the South, and journeyed to stop him once and for all by murdering the child before he became the Aesi. Sogolon failed, and her memory was wiped from her, leading her to become the Moon Witch in the Sunk City. Other Bunshi helped to save the Aesi, and Sogolon does not trust Popele because of this. The Aesi rejoined the royal household of the North, and the Northern kings have become more and more corrupt under the continued influence of the Aesi over centuries. Popele and Nsaka convinced Sogolon to join them to restore the true king to the North through the King Sister, who has been banished to Mantha much like Emini and other King Sisters before her. Sogolon is only convinced due to her desire for revenge over her lost life.

With Nsaka and Popele, Sogolon returns to Fasisi and meets her descendants, many of whom also possess their own gifts like the wind (no wind). They journey to Mantha, where they meet the King Sister, who is not convinced of their plight. Sogolon encounters spies for the Aesi, learns more of his powers, and encounters ninki nankas, or water dragons. The King Sister becomes pregnant from a minor Prince and has the baby. Spies alert the Aesi, and they are forced to flee Mantha, separating the baby and the King Sister. Sogolon, Nsaka, the King Sister and others flee aboard the Chipfalambula, a great fish with an island on its back, and then use the Ten and Nine Doors, magical portals to escape from Mitu to Kongor. After entering the Ten and Nine Doors, Sogolon is beset by spirits from parallel realms, including spirits of men she had killed in vengeance as the Moon Witch. When they arrive in Dolingo, Sogolon realizes it is the city in the trees that Emini planned. Almost all functions are automated, including elevators and carts to move between the trees. Dolingo is ruled by the Queen and managed and run by the White Scientists, necromancers who have perfected the art of human cloning. Sogolon attempts to convince the Queen of Dolingo to join their cause to stop the Aesi and find the boy. Sogolon discovers that the "automation" of Dolingo is actually the work of slaves hidden in the walls and floors of Dolingo, horrifying her and leaving her disillusioned with the richness of Dolingo. 

Part 4 The Wolf and the Lightning Bird 
At this point, Sogolon's story intersects with Tracker from Black Leopard, Red Wolf, providing Sogolon's perspective on the events of that book.

Part 5 No Oriki

Major characters and creatures
Major characters
Sogolon, originally a no name girl, names herself after her deceased mother. Also called Forbidden Lily, Moon Witch, Chibundu, No Name Boy, and others. 
Miss Azora, owner of a pleasure house that shelters Sogolon
Mistress Komwono, a lady who takes in Sogolon 
Master Komwono, her husband and a lord 
Keme, royal scout, later Sogolon's husband. Later revealed to be a shapeshifter, a lion.
Kwash Kagar, of House Akum, king when Sogolon first arrives in Fasisi 
Emini, formerly Princess of House Akum, formerly King Sister, sister of Kwash Moki nee Prince Likud
Kwash Moki, formerly Prince Likud of House Akum, son of Kwash Kagar
The Aesi, a mysterious counselor to the King. The Aesi is mystical in nature (referred to as a god or a demon) and has the power of resurrection, being reborn each time he is killed as a new child who manifests as the Aesi when they turn 12 years old (ten and two years in the lexicon of the books). He has the power to invade people's minds and dream, erase memories, use spells, and control people telepathically. 

Creatures
Ukundunka a guardian creature with one withered hand and one powerful hand, one long leg and one short leg (both as long as trees) that is fast and violent. Tied to talismans as guardians
Omozulu, roof-walking shadow demons. Summoned through an incantation using a target's blood, they relentlessly hunt their prey. 
The Sangomin, apprentices to necromancers and witchfinders that each exhibit their own unique appearance and abilities. Most often cast out of their homes as children, believed to be cursed. Many are gathered in childhood when they manifest abilities, trained, and employed and used by the royal family and the Aesi 
shapeshifters, can live as animals or as man form
Bunshi, minor water spirits, tricksters
Chipfalambula, massive intelligent fish that grow so large forests can grow on their backs. Typically found in rivers but can on occasion live in the ocean.
Zogbanu, trolls from the Blood Swamp
Ipundulu, vampire lightning birds that appear to be handsome, white-skined men wrapped in robes. In reality, the robes are their wings and they transform into carnivorous creatures when provoked. Ipundulu's are commanded and tied to witches. If an Ipundulu is masterless, it is called an Ishologu
Sasabonsam, a bat-winged ogre with clawed feet, tusks, and black skin
Eloko, a grass troll with green hair, cannibalistic 
Adze, a vampiriric creature, appears to be a young boy. Actually a sentient swarm of vampiric bugs
Ogo, giants

Themes 
The novel's themes include femininity and power, survival, the fundamentals of truth, what a name means and the power of names, appearance and double lives, the limits of power, the excesses of ambition, desire, and Machiavellianism. James offers a clue to his underlying theme early on in the saga: "Truth eats lies just as the crocodile eats the moon."

Development 
James conceived the idea for the book long before his reception of the 2015 Man Booker Prize for his novel A Brief History of Seven Killings; he has repeatedly expressed his desire to build a "vast playground of [African] myth and history and legend that other people can draw from," analogously to J. R. R. Tolkien's similar efforts for Britain. His research, which began "in August 2015," two months before he won the Booker, took two years and was largely focused on the condition of "the pre-Christian, pre-Islam, original African religious Africa." The cultures which James principally drew on were "central and west African with a bit from the east"; the cultures of the Omo valley informed the Ku and Gangatom villages, and West African empires (Mali, Songhai, and Ghana) were the inspiration for the book's depiction of cities.

James has acknowledged his debt to the fluid nature of African oral storytelling and poetry, celebrating "the whole idea that nothing is fixed in this universe"; the implications of the unreliability of the narrator in traditional Anansi stories, he argues, "[are] not just shifting truth, it’s shifting shape, it’s shifting identity, it’s shifting sexual preference." In addition, he has noted that the idea of "an authentic story" or "director's cut" is alien to African storytelling, in which multiple versions of the same story may be given equal weight.

He began writing after a conversation with Melina Matsoukas, who mentioned the television series The Affair, in which both halves of a troubled couple remember their affair in subtly different ways; James intends the Dark Star trilogy to comprise three characters' conflicting accounts of the same events; the sequel, Moon Witch, Spider King, will be the witch Sogolon's account. James completed approximately one hundred pages of the novel before the end of the fall semester in 2016, having begun writing at the beginning of the semester.

Before the first book's release, James referred to the planned trilogy as "African Game of Thrones". He later said that the description was a joke, although he does not regret the comparison, commenting that both series retain supernatural elements while telling "decidedly adult" stories.

Adaptation
Michael B. Jordan purchased the rights to produce a film adaptation of the first novel in February 2019. James has expressed curiosity about a potential adaptation, noting that "our cinematic language of sci-fi and fantasy is still very European—particularly fantasy. And Black Leopard, Red Wolf is not even remotely European."

Reception
NPR described the novel as "Sogolon's tale makes this a rare sequel that is better than the first," and "a novel that begs to be read in one sitting — though it is nearly impossible to do so without coming out the other end feeling overwhelmed and exhausted. But make no mistake, this series is absolutely a must-read".

Dzifa Benson, in a review published by the Financial Times wrote, "As gripping as the novel is, it’s a long and tough read...James’s story is a dense, sprawling phantasmagoria made even more labyrinthine by his stream-of-consciousness idiosyncrasies and sudden time leaps. It’s a confident writer who uses African words and phrases without the need for exposition and sustains a diction that mimics the present-tense grammatical syntax of many west African languages. But Moon Witch rewards a reader’s perseverance and makes you wonder exactly who’ll play fast and loose with the truth in the final instalment, if you have the stomach and staying power to seek it out".

Sequels 
The third volume will tentatively be titled White Wing, Dark Star. The titles were initially given as Moon Witch, Night Devil and The Boy and the Dark Star. In 2019, James described the plan of the trilogy: "this one is more picaresque, adventure, odyssey. The second one is probably more historical, magical realist. And the third one is gonna be mostly horror."

References

Notes

2022 fantasy novels
Novels by Marlon James
2022 American novels
American fantasy novels
Riverhead Books books
Fictional werecats
LGBT speculative fiction novels
2020s LGBT novels